The Alouette was a passenger train jointly operated by the Boston and Maine Railroad and the Canadian Pacific Railway between Montreal, Quebec and Boston, Massachusetts.  The Alouette began service on April 26, 1926, operating on a daytime schedule with coach and parlor car service.  At Newport, Vermont passengers could transfer to Quebec Central Railway trains bound for Sherbrooke and Quebec City. For passengers originating from Boston on the night train counterpart north, the Red Wing (#325/#302), the train would join with the New York-Quebec City Connecticut Yankee to complete the trip to Quebec City.

Until late 1954, the train operated over Canadian Pacific trackage to Wells River, Vermont, where it entered the Boston and Maine for the remainder of the way to Boston via Plymouth, New Hampshire and Concord, New Hampshire on the division that the B&M had acquired with the purchase of the Concord and Montreal Railroad in 1895.  After the Boston and Maine abandoned its trackage north of Plymouth, the train was rerouted via White River Junction, Vermont. The train continued to travel via Wells River, St. Johnsbury and Newport, Vermont, before completing the trip to Vermont.

In 1956, the Alouette switched to using Budd Rail Diesel Cars, eliminating the buffet-parlor car. The train lost its name and its original number and became #31 north and #32 south and it no longer had food concession service. The overnight Red Wing was numbered #29/#30 and retained its sleeping cars and only offered breakfast exclusively to its sleeping car passengers. The overnight Red Wing had its last run on October 24, 1959. From April 25, 1965, the Boston & Maine pulled out of its cooperation, and the Alouette successor #31/32 only operated on the Canadian Pacific Railway's Montreal to Wells River, Vermont segment. That remaining segment ended service on October 30, 1965. This ended a tradition of Boston to Montreal trains, dating back to 1887.

References

External links
1957 schedule of the Alouette and Red Wing, with consists, at 'Streamliner Schedules'

International named passenger trains
Railway services introduced in 1926
Railway services discontinued in 1956
Named passenger trains of the United States
Named passenger trains of Canada
Passenger rail transport in Quebec
Passenger rail transportation in Vermont
Passenger rail transportation in New Hampshire
Passenger rail transportation in Massachusetts
Passenger trains of the Boston and Maine Railroad
Canadian Pacific Railway passenger trains